Catherine (12th-century) was a Swedish princess, daughter of King Eric the Saint and his queen, Christina of Sweden.

Biography 

She married Nils Blake, who probably was a Swedish magnate. They had a daughter, Kristina Nilsdotter, who married the Norwegian Earl Hakon the Mad, and later Eskil Magnusson, the lawspeaker of Västergötland.

References 

12th-century births
Catherine 1140
Year of death unknown
House of Eric
12th-century Swedish women
Daughters of kings